Dendrobium guerreroi, or Guerrero's dendrobium, is a member of the family Orchidaceae endemic to the Philippines. It was named in honor of Mr. Guerrero, a Filipino orchid collector in the 1900s. This species is a small to medium to large sized, warm growing epiphyte with thin descendant, clumping pseudobulbs that rarely branch and carry many, unsubdivided, pointed fleshy leaves. Flowers are 3 centimeters and are yellow with light orange labia.

References

guerreroi
Endemic orchids of the Philippines
Plants described in 1932